Sébastien Demers (born 24 December 1979) is a Canadian former professional boxer who competed from 2004 to 2013 and challenged for the IBF middleweight title in 2007.

Professional career
Demers is a former Canadian and IBF International middleweight title champion.

Demers then faced Walid Smichet for the Canadian title and IBF International middleweight titles. Demers had just been beaten for the first time in his career after facing Arthur Abraham for the IBF middleweight title in Germany.

Prefight Smichet had predicted that he would knockout Demers within eight rounds. Smichet was initially the aggressor and pushed forward relentlessly to take Demers out of his rhythm; however he lost momentum towards the end of the fight and Demers' superior technique pulled him through. Demers won a clear points verdict, however, the decision was met with a chorus of boos with commentators stating that the fight was much closer than the score cards suggested with Demers just nicking many of the rounds. Demers stated "I thought I won the rounds, but closely!".

On 5 November 2011 Demers lost to Allan Green in Quebec City.

Professional boxing record

References

External links
 
Video of the Smichet v Demers fight

1979 births
Living people
Sportspeople from Saint-Hyacinthe
Middleweight boxers
Canadian male boxers